Husayn ibn Muhammad ibn Ali al-Astarabadi was a 15th-century Persian physician from Astarabad, Golestan, Persia.
 
In 1427, he wrote his well-known commentary on Jaghmini's summary of The Canon of Medicine of Avicenna. Astarabadi dedicated it to Prince Murtada.

Little else is known of his life.

See also
List of Iranian scientists

Sources
For information on his only known treatise, see:
Carl Brockelmann, Geschichte der arabischen Litteratur, 1st edition, 2 vols. (Leiden: Brill, 1889–1936). Second edition, 2 vols. (Leiden: Brill, 1943–49). Page references will be to those of the first edition, with the 2nd edition page numbers given in parentheses. vol. 1, p. 457 (598)
Carl Brockelmann, Geschichte der arabischen Litteratur, Supplement, 3 vols. (Leiden: Brill, 1937–1942), vol. 1, p. 826.
A.Z. Iskandar, A Catalogue of Arabic Manuscripts on Medicine and Science in the Wellcome Historical Medical Library (London: The Wellcome Historical Medical Library, 1967), pp. 56–57 and 184.
A.Z. Iskandar, A Descriptive List of Arabic Manuscripts on Medicine and Science at the University of California, Los Angeles (Leiden: Brill, 1984), p. 73.

References

Founder of the Horufi sect.

15th-century Iranian physicians
Year of birth unknown
Year of death unknown
People from Gorgan